( The Junior Olsen Gang and the Silver Mine Mystery) is a 2007 Norwegian children's film, the fourth movie of the Olsenbanden Jr. series.

Production

Plot
The plot follows the young members of the Olsenband when they chase the lost crown jewels in the royal mines. The pursuit of the lost crown jewels leads Egon Olsen and his friends as well as their enemies to Kongsberg, while they're hunted by police.

Cast
Ola Isaac Høgåsen Mæhlen as Egon
Ole Martin Wølner as Benny
Robert Opsahl as Kjell
Maren Eikli Hjorth as Valborg

Reception

References

External links

2000s Norwegian-language films
2007 films
Norwegian children's films
Prequel films
Olsenbanden films
2000s children's films
Norwegian prequel films